Arthur Jepson (12 July 1915 – 17 July 1997) was an English first-class cricketer who played for Nottinghamshire before becoming an umpire. In addition to cricket he was also an accomplished football goalkeeper who played over 100 games in the Football League before turning his hand to management.

A right-arm fast-medium bowler for Nottinghamshire between 1938 and 1959, he took 1050 first-class wickets, becoming one of the top ten most prolific bowlers in the club's history. He then spent 26 years as an umpire, presiding over four Test matches.

In his footballing career he played for non-league sides Newark Town, Mansfield Town, and Grantham Town, before playing for Port Vale either side of World War II. He then spent 1946 to 1948 in the top-flight with Stoke City, before winding down his career following a two-year stint with Lincoln City. He later turned out for non-league sides Northwich Victoria and Gloucester City, and also briefly managed Long Eaton United and Hinckley United.

Cricket career
Jepson, a right-arm fast-medium bowler, made his county debut as a 23-year-old in 1938. He had his best summer in 1947 when he took 115 wickets at 27.78, the only occasion when he took more than 100 wickets in a season. On the back of his prolific summer he represented the Marylebone Cricket Club twice the following year.

In a match against Leicestershire in 1958, his penultimate season, he took a career best 8 for 45 to dismiss Leicestershire in their second innings for 128. He brought up his 1000th first-class wicket when he had first innings century maker and captain Willie Watson caught by Norman Hill.

He batted mostly in the lower order and made a solitary century in his first-class career, an innings of 130 against Worcestershire at Trent Bridge when he shared in a sixth wicket partnership of 270 with opener Reg Simpson.

After retiring as a cricketer, Jepson turned to umpiring and officiated in county matches up until 1985. He umpired in the Gillette Cup and NatWest Trophy from 1963 to 1987. Between 1966 and 1969 he umpired four Test matches, the first of which was between England and the West Indies at Nottingham, where Basil Butcher scored a double hundred. He also umpired in five One Day Internationals, including three at the 1975 Cricket World Cup; East Africa vs India, Sri Lanka vs West Indies, and Pakistan vs Sri Lanka.

Football career
In football Jepson was a goalkeeper, after leaving Newark Town he played for Mansfield Town and then Grantham Town. In June 1938 he joined Port Vale and made his Third Division South debut in a 1–0 defeat at Clapton Orient on 8 September. He proved to be a more competent keeper than George Heppell and was an ever-present at The Old Recreation Ground during the rest of the 1938–39 season despite problems with injury and gaining permission to play from Nottinghamshire County Cricket Club. Also a regular during the 1939–40 campaign, during the war he guested for Nottingham Forest, Watford, Notts County and Swansea Town. After his demobbing from the forces in October 1945 he was one of six pre-war Port Vale players who returned to Burslem, regaining his place in the side.

After suffering a serious spinal injury in February 1946 he missed the rest of the season. He also missed the start of the 1946–47 season, this time due to his cricketing commitments. In September 1946, having played 92 games for the Vale over all competitions, he was sold to local rivals Stoke City for a £3,750 fee, as Vale manager Billy Frith believed Heppell to be a superior goalkeeper. Stoke manager Bob McGrory used Jepson in 31 games in 1946–47, ahead of rivals Dennis Herod and Emmanuel Foster, as the "Potters" recorded a fourth-place finish in the First Division – a club record finish that still stands. However Jepson made just one appearance in 1947–48, with Herod being the preferred stopper.

After two seasons at the Victoria Ground, he moved on to newly promoted Second Division side Lincoln City in 1948. He kept goal for Bill Anderson's side in 58 league games, as the "Imps" were relegated in last place in 1948–49, only missing out on promotion out of the Third Division North by four points in 1949–50. Leaving Sincil Bank in 1950 he later played for non-league sides Northwich Victoria and Gloucester City before becoming the first manager of Long Eaton United in June 1956, before he departed in March 1957 after 15 wins in 29 games. He later managed Hinckley Town and Hinckley Athletic and scout for Coventry City and Middlesbrough.

Personal life
Jepson had one son and one daughter, and in later life he helped his son (a golf professional), manage a sports equipment shop near the family home at Kirkby-in-Ashfield.

Career statistics
Source:

See also
 List of Test cricket umpires
 List of One Day International cricket umpires

References

External links

1915 births
1997 deaths
People from Selston
Footballers from Nottinghamshire
Cricketers from Nottinghamshire
English cricketers
Nottinghamshire cricketers
Marylebone Cricket Club cricketers
English Test cricket umpires
English One Day International cricket umpires
English footballers
Association football goalkeepers
Newark Town F.C. players
Mansfield Town F.C. players
Grantham Town F.C. players
Port Vale F.C. players
British military personnel of World War II
Nottingham Forest F.C. players
Watford F.C. wartime guest players
Notts County F.C. wartime guest players
Swansea Town A.F.C. wartime guest players
Stoke City F.C. players
Lincoln City F.C. players
Northwich Victoria F.C. players
Gloucester City A.F.C. players
Hinckley Athletic F.C. players
English Football League players
English football managers
Long Eaton United F.C. managers
Association football scouts
Middlesbrough F.C. non-playing staff